Mary Anne Jablonski  (born c. 1952) is a Canadian politician and former Member of the Legislative Assembly of Alberta representing the constituency of Red Deer North as a Progressive Conservative.

Early life

Jablonski was born and raised with three sisters and a brother in St. Catharines, Ontario. She studied psychology and political science at Brock University on scholarship. She married her husband, Bob, in 1971. The couple has three children.

In 1980, Bob was transferred to Penhold with the Canadian Forces and the family moved to Alberta with him. Mary Anne Jablonski participated in a successful lobby effort in the early 1980s, petitioning the federal government for dental plans for families of military personnel and Royal Canadian Mounted Police (RCMP) members, and promoting the rights of military spouses.

Jablonski worked in a bank for seven years. She and her husband also owned and operated a fiberglass manufacturing company for many years. They employed 18 people and produced a variety of objects, including waterslides, jet boats and RV parts.

Political career

Jablonski was first elected in a 2000 by-election to fill a spot left vacant by Stockwell Day, who resigned to seek the leadership of the federal Canadian Alliance party. Since her election, Jablonski has been a member of numerous committees and chaired the Cabinet Policy Committee on Community Services; Alberta Mental Health Board Liaison and Advisory Committee; Standing Policy Committee on Justice and Government Services; Youth Secretariat; and Corrections Review Committee.

Jablonski was elected to her fourth term representing the constituency of Red Deer North in the 2008 provincial election. Premier Ed Stelmach appointed her minister of Seniors and Community Supports on March 13, 2008. Stelmach gave Jablonski a mandate of improving quality, supply and choice in the continuing care system, and supporting persons with disabilities' independence and self-reliance through employability incentives. In addition, Jablonski formed a Demographic Planning Commission to consult with Albertans and to develop an Aging Population Framework. She also began meeting with major stakeholder groups and touring care facilities throughout Alberta.

As of January 2010, she is being criticized for cuts being made to Alberta's Person's With Developmental Disabilities Program (P.D.D.). 
In response to public criticism of cuts to the PDD program Jablonski has clarified that, "due to fiscal restraint measures taken across government, this increase is reduced by $11.3 million, or about two per cent of the overall program budget. The end result is still an increase to the PDD budget of approximately $22 million." Many people involved in the care of Persons with a Developmental Disability,  feel that the cuts are "the wrong decision."

She announced in January 2015 that she would not seek re-election in the coming provincial election.

Personal life

Jablonski lives with her husband Bob in Red Deer. The couple has three adult children and five grandchildren. In her free time, she enjoys camping and hiking with family.

Jablonski has been active in many community groups, including the Catholic Women's League, Girl Guides of Canada and the Chamber of Commerce. In 1999, as a member of ITC (formerly Toast Mistresses), she won the international speech competition in Kobe, Japan.

Election results

References

Progressive Conservative Association of Alberta MLAs
Living people
People from Red Deer, Alberta
Politicians from St. Catharines
Women MLAs in Alberta
Members of the Executive Council of Alberta
1952 births
21st-century Canadian politicians
21st-century Canadian women politicians
Women government ministers of Canada